The Lake Vyrnwy Half Marathon is an annual half marathon Welsh road running event which takes place around Lake Vyrnwy each September.

History

The first Lake Vyrnwy Half Marathon was held in 1988 in aid of the St Wddyn's Church Restoration Fund
. An appeal to raise money 
towards the church roof had been placed in a local newspaper and Doug Morris, of the Oswestry Olympians, offered to organise a half marathon for the appeal
. 
The race has been run annually until 2008 when after Doug Morris' death, just before the 2007 edition, the race organisers took a year off before restarting in 2009.

Course
The race consists of just over one lap of the lake.

Winners

See also
St Wddyn Church, Llanwddyn in Wikimedia Commons

References

External links
The official website of the Lake Vyrnwy Half Marathon

Athletics competitions in Wales
Half marathons in the United Kingdom
Recurring sporting events established in 1988